Sapote (from Nahuatl tzapotl) is a term for a soft, edible fruit. The word is incorporated into the common names of several unrelated fruit-bearing plants native to southern Mexico, Central America and northern parts of South America. It is also known in Caribbean English as soapapple.

Sapotaceae
Some but not all sapotes come from the family Sapotaceae:

 Sapodilla, also called naseberry (Manilkara zapota) is native to Mexico, Guatemala, Nicaragua, Belize, and possibly El Salvador. The Sapotaceae were named after a synonym of this species.
 Yellow sapote (Pouteria campechiana) is native to Mexico and Central America.
 Mamey sapote (Pouteria sapota) is from southern Mexico to northern South America.
 Green sapote (Pouteria viridis) is native to lowland southern Mexico.

Ebenaceae
Sapotes from the family Ebenaceae include:

 Black sapote (Diospyros nigra), from eastern Mexico south to Colombia, is probably the original Aztec tzapotl.
 Chapote (Diospyros texana) is native to the lower Rio Grande valley region in Texas and Mexico

Other sapote
 White sapote (Casimiroa edulis: Rutaceae) is native to northern and central Mexico, Costa Rica, El Salvador and Guatemala.
 South American sapote (Quararibea cordata: Malvaceae) is native to the Amazon rainforests of Brazil, Colombia, Ecuador, and Peru.
 Sun sapote (Licania platypus: Chrysobalanaceae) is native to southern Mexico south to Colombia.

References

Nahuatl words and phrases
Tropical fruit
Crops originating from the Americas